The Sakaleona Falls are the highest waterfalls of Madagascar, with a height of .

References

Waterfalls of Madagascar

Vatovavy